R+ or R Plus may refer to:

 R+ tree, a data structure in computer science
 , the set of positive real numbers (or, depending on author, the set of non-negative real numbers)
 Positive reinforcement, in behavioural psychology
 Rammstein, German band
 R Plus (musician), pseudonym of music producer Rollo Armstrong
 Rocksmith +, a video game made by Ubisoft